The 2001 Biathlon Junior World Championships was held in Khanty-Mansiysk, Russia from March 21 to March 26, 2001. There was to be a total of eight competitions: sprint, pursuit, individual, mass start, and relay races for men and women.

Medal winners

Junior Women

Junior Men

Medal table

References

External links
Official IBU website 

Biathlon Junior World Championships
2001 in biathlon
2001 in Russian sport
International sports competitions hosted by Russia
2001 in youth sport